Joonas Ilmari Cavén (born 9 January 1993) is a Finnish professional basketball player who currently plays for the Tampereen Pyrintö of Finland's Korisliiga. He has previously played in Spain for Joventut Badalona of the Liga ACB, but mostly for the club's development team CB Prat of the Spanish third tier league LEB Plata. He also competes for the Finnish national team as he made his debut in August 2013 against Russia.

Professional career
Cavén played for the Tampereen Pyrintö junior team in 2009–10 before he joined the senior team in 2010–11 where he made his debut on 12 January 2011. He also spent time with the junior team in 2010–11 as well.

In 2011, Cavén signed with Joventut Badalona and immediately joined their junior team CB Prat of the LEB Plata. After two seasons playing for Prat, Cavén made his Liga ACB debut on 20 October 2013 and went on to play a further four games for Joventut in 2013–14.

In April 2014, Cavén declared for the 2014 NBA draft but later withdrew his entry before the deadline.

On 1 November 2014 Cavén was selected by the Reno Bighorns with the 10th overall pick in the 2014 NBA D-League draft. On 21 January 2015 he was traded to the Delaware 87ers in exchange for the player rights for Melvin Johnson III and the returning player rights to Elijah Pittman.

On 30 September 2015 Cavén returned to Tampereen Pyrintö.

References

External links
Eurobasket.com Profile
ACB.com Profile 

1993 births
Living people
CB Prat players
Delaware 87ers players
Finnish expatriate basketball people in Spain
Finnish expatriate basketball people in the United States
Finnish men's basketball players
Forwards (basketball)
Joventut Badalona players
Liga ACB players
People from Nokia, Finland
Reno Bighorns players
Tampereen Pyrintö players
Sportspeople from Pirkanmaa